The following is a list of hydroelectric power stations in Turkey with a nameplate capacity of 100 MW or more.

There are about 60 power plants of 100 MW and over operating as hydroelectricity in Turkey. Total installed capacity is 32 GW. A few plants are under construction.

Map

Hydroelectric power stations

See also 

 List of power stations in Turkey

External links

References 

 
Dams in Turkey
Turkey